Marcus Alan Williams (born September 8, 1996) is an American football free safety for the Baltimore Ravens of the National Football League (NFL). He played college football at Utah.

Early years
Williams attended Eleanor Roosevelt High School in Eastvale, California. He played wide receiver and defensive back for the Mustangs football team. He also played basketball and ran track. He committed to play college football at the University of Utah over competing scholarship offers from Washington and California.

College career
As a true freshman at Utah in 2014, Williams played in all 13 games and made six starts. He finished the 2014 season with 59 tackles and an interception. As a sophomore in 2015, he was named first-team All-Pac-12 after he recorded 65 tackles and five interceptions in 13 starts. He intercepted a pass from California's Jared Goff in the Utes' 30–24 win on October 10. As a junior in 2016, after missing some games due to injury, he returned on November 10 against Arizona State and recorded nine tackles and had an interception in the end zone. He played in 11 games, recording 64 tackles and five interceptions. He recorded four interceptions during the regular season and was a second-team All-Pac-12 selection. After the season, Williams entered the 2017 NFL Draft. He finished his college career with 11 interceptions and 188 total tackles. He was predicted to be a first-round or second-round selection by several sportswriters and mock drafts.

Professional career 
Williams received an invitation to the NFL Combine and completed all of the combine drills. He also attended Utah's Pro Day and opted to only run positional drills for team scouts and representatives. NFL draft experts and analysts projected him to be selected in the second or third round. He was ranked the fifth best safety in the draft by NFL analyst Bucky Brooks, Mike Mayock, and Sports Illustrated, ranked the third best free safety by NFLDraftScout.com, and was ranked the eighth best safety by ESPN.

New Orleans Saints

2017
The New Orleans Saints selected Williams in the second round (42nd overall) of the 2017 NFL Draft. He was the sixth safety selected in 2017. 

On June 3, 2017, the New Orleans Saints signed Williams to a four-year, $6.24 million contract that includes $3.42 million guaranteed and a signing bonus of $2.67 million.

During training camp, Williams competed for the role as a starting free safety against Vonn Bell. Head coach Sean Payton officially named him the backup, behind Bell, to begin the regular season.

He made his professional regular season debut and first career start in the New Orleans Saints' season-opener at the Minnesota Vikings and recorded five combined tackles in their 29–19 loss. He was credited with his first career tackle on wide receiver Stefon Diggs after pushing him out of bounds on the Vikings' first drive, but drew an unnecessary roughness penalty after hitting Diggs while he was out of bounds. On September 24, 2017, Williams assisted on two tackles, deflected a pass, and made his first career interception off a pass by Cam Newton during a 34–13 win at the Carolina Panthers in Week 3. He was inactive for the Saints' Week 13 victory against the Carolina Panthers, due to a groin injury he sustained the previous week. On December 31, 2017, Williams collected a season-high eight combined tackles, two pass deflections, and made a season-high two interceptions off pass attempts by Jameis Winston in the Saints' 31–24 loss at the Tampa Bay Buccaneers. He finished his rookie season with 73 combined tackles (59 solo), seven pass deflections, and four interceptions in 15 games and 15 starts. During the season, Williams was used as a third safety in Dennis Allen's three-safety technique and as an extra defensive back in nickel and dime packages. Pro Football Focus gave Williams an overall grade of 86.8, ranking him 11th among all qualified safeties in 2017.

The Saints finished first in the NFC South with an 11–5 record. On January 7, 2018, Williams started his first career playoff game and recorded eight combined tackles and a pass deflection during a 31–26 victory against the Carolina Panthers in the NFC Wildcard Game.

On January 14, 2018, Williams made five combined tackles, two pass deflections, and intercepted a pass from Case Keenum, enabling the Saints to score a touchdown and bring their score within three points of the Vikings. At the end of the game, with the Saints up by one point, Williams whiffed trying to hit Stefon Diggs instead of tackling him. With no other defenders between him and the end zone, Diggs took an intermediate pass along the right sideline from Keenum for a 61-yard touchdown as time expired. The play lifted Minnesota to a 29–24 victory in the NFC Divisional Round and eliminated New Orleans from the playoffs. On that play, Williams lowered his head and attempted to hit Diggs without seeing him. He not only whiffed on Diggs, he accidentally knocked teammate Ken Crawley off his feet. The play became known as the Minneapolis Miracle.

2018
Head coach Sean Payton retained Williams as the starting free safety in 2018. He started alongside strong safety Kurt Coleman. On September 16, 2018, Williams recorded four solo tackles, deflected a pass, and made an interception during a 21–18 victory against the Cleveland Browns in Week 2.

2019
In week 1 against the Houston Texans, Williams intercepted a pass from Deshaun Watson that was intended for DeAndre Hopkins in the 30–28 win.
In week 4 against the Dallas Cowboys, Williams intercepted a Hail Mary pass from Dak Prescott to seal a 12–10 win.
In week 7 against the Chicago Bears, Williams forced a fumble on rookie runningback David Montgomery which was recovered by teammate A. J. Klein in the 36–25 win.
In week 11 against the Tampa Bay Buccaneers, Williams recorded a 55-yard pick six off Jameis Winston in the 34–17 win.

2020
In Week 1 against the Tampa Bay Buccaneers, Williams recorded his first interception off a pass thrown by Tom Brady during the 34–23 win.

2021

On March 9, 2021, the Saints placed the franchise tag on Williams. He signed the one-year tender on March 30.

Baltimore Ravens
On March 16, 2022, Williams signed a five-year $70 million contract with the Baltimore Ravens.

2022
In Week 1 against the New York Jets, he was the team's leading tackler with 12 combined tackles as well as a 33-yard interception return and a forced fumble. The Ravens would win 24–9. He suffered a dislocated wrist in Week 5 and was placed on injured reserve on October 11, 2022. He was activated on December 10.

References

External links
 
  New Orleans Saints bio
 Utah Utes bio

1996 births
Living people
Sportspeople from Corona, California
Players of American football from California
American football safeties
Utah Utes football players
People from Eastvale, California
New Orleans Saints players
Baltimore Ravens players